Wizex is a Swedish dansband formed in Osby in 1973. It purchased the rights to the name from a band that started as Ulrik Wittmans Kvintett in 1957. When Ulrik Wittman left the band in 1963 they started to use the name Wizex. When read out the name sounds like "The Six of Us", "vi sex", in Swedish, and it was six persons left in the band when they changed the name. Today's band had six founders and was allowed to purchase the name, and hence use 1973 as the starting point.

Wizex broke through in 1977 when they performed on nationwide TV-show Nygammalt and got its first top ten on the Swedish charts same year with the song Vagabond. The following year they finished 2nd in the Swedish Melodifestivalen 1978.

Big hits with Wizex were songs as Tusen och en natt, Djupa vatten, Miss Decibel, Älska mig, Om himlen och Österlen, Flickan, jägarn och priset, Jag måste nå min ängel, Som en symfoni and När vi rör varann.

The record Take Me To Your Heaven sold 235 000 copies. The song was Charlotte Nilssons contribution to the Swedish Melodifestivalen 1999, and marked the starting point for her solo career. Wizex also had many Svensktoppen hits.

In 1979, Wizex won the Rockbjörnen award by Aftonbladet as "dansband of the year". This was the only time this category was included.

Members 
Following female singers have fronted Wizex since 1973, when Kikki Danielsson together with other founding members purchased the rights to the name Wizex:  
Kikki Danielsson left in 1982
Lena Pålsson left in 1997
Charlotte Nilsson left in September 1999
Paula Pennsäter left in March 2002
Jessica Sjöholm left in 2007
Anna Sköld maternal leave in 2011
Lina Wägbo 2011 (temporary replacement)
Anna Sköld left in 2021
Git Persson since 2021

Other notable members were Danne Stråhed (2nd singer) and Henri Saffer (guitar).

Discography 
1974: Skratta och le
1975: Rusar vidare
1976: Har du glömt
1977: Som en sång
1978: Miss Decibel
1978: Carousel
1979: Wizex bäzta
1979: Some Girls & Trouble Boys
1980: Greatest Hits
1980: You Treated Me Wrong
1982: Nattfjäril
1983: Julie
1984: Det är dej jag väntar på
1985: Ska du komma loss
1987: Dansa i månens sken
1988: Mjölnarens Irene
1989: Vägen hem
1990: Spanska ögon
1992: Jag kan se en ängel
1992: Jag måste ge mej av
1993: Vår hemmagjorda dansmusik
1993: Julafton hemma
1995: Wizex med Lena Pålsson & Kikki Danielsson
1995: Varma vindar
1997: Några enkla rader
1997: Jorden snurrar
1997: Samma ensamma jag
1998: Mot nya mål
1999: Tusen och en natt
2000: Om du var här
2002: Guldkorn (2002)
2006: Wizexponerad
2010: Innan det är för sent 
2012: Simsalabim
2013: 40 år i folkparkens tjänst
2014: Schlagers på väg
2015: Nu börjar det linka jul
2016: Game Set & Match

References

External links
Homepage 

Musical groups established in 1973
Dansbands
Swedish musical groups
1973 establishments in Sweden
Melodifestivalen contestants of 1992